Hannibal are multi-functional high-rise buildings in the city of Dortmund in the districts Nordstadt and Dorstfeld.

Two high-rise building projects were built with the name Hannibal, which were built in the 1970s. In the district Dortmund Innenstadt-Nord (Nordstadt), there was built a 50 meters (164.5 feet) high-rise apartment building. From 1994 to 1999, the building was refurbished by the house owner LEG Nordrhein-Westfalen.

References 

Buildings and structures in Dortmund
Skyscrapers in Germany
Dortmund